Christian "Kiki" Recinos (born 24 December 1994) is an American-born Guatemalan footballer who plays as a midfielder.

External links 
 

1994 births
Living people
People with acquired Guatemalan citizenship
Guatemalan women's footballers
Guatemala women's international footballers
Tyler Junior College alumni
Grand Canyon Antelopes women's soccer players
American women's soccer players
American people of Guatemalan descent
American sportspeople of North American descent
Sportspeople of Guatemalan descent
Soccer players from Texas
Sportspeople from Arlington, Texas
Women's association football midfielders